Grace-Dieu is a placename of Leicestershire, England, named after Grace Dieu Priory which fell into disrepair following the dissolution of the monasteries by Henry VIII. The ruins are visible from the main road to Loughborough. Grace Dieu Manor was a private house then a preparatory school, Grace Dieu Manor School. It is near to Thringstone. The population is now listed in the civil parish of Belton.

Gracedieu Vineyard is south facing and was established in 1991 in Charnwood Forest. Its 'Green Man' wine based on the Madeleine Angevine grape is known for its floral bouquet.

Hamlets in Leicestershire
North West Leicestershire District